South Candler Street–Agnes Scott College Historic District is a historic district in Decatur, Georgia that was listed on the National Register of Historic Places in 1994. It includes Agnes Scott College, also known as Decatur Female Seminary (1889) and as Agnes Scott Institute (1890-1906), and Little Decatur.

In 1994 it included 88 contributing buildings, two contributing structures, and a contributing object, as well as 19 non-contributing buildings and two non-contributing structures.

The oldest house in the district is the Italianate C. M. Candler House (1870s) at 158 South Candler.  Another old one is the George Washington Scott House (1883) at 312 South Candler Street which has a double gambrel roof and Queen Anne detailing.

The oldest building on the campus is Agnes Scott Hall (1891), known also simply as "Main," a three-story, brick building designed by local architects Bruce and Morgan.

References

Historic districts on the National Register of Historic Places in Georgia (U.S. state)
Agnes Scott College
National Register of Historic Places in DeKalb County, Georgia